Azman bin Ismail (Jawi: عزمن بن إسماعيل) is a Malaysian politician who has served as the Member of Parliament (MP) for Kuala Kedah since May 2013. He is a member of the People's Justice Party (PKR), a component party of the Pakatan Harapan (PH) opposition coalition.

Before entering politics, Azman was a medical doctor.  He entered Parliament after winning the Kuala Kedah federal seat in the 2013 general election, replacing the Ahmad Kassim as the party's candidate.  At the election, Azman defeated the Barisan Nasional (BN) candidate and fellow medical doctor Zaki Zamani Abd Rashid by 4,947 votes.  In the 2018 general election, he was re-elected as the MP for Kuala Kedah.

Election results

References

1959 births
Living people
Malaysian people of Malay descent
Malaysian Muslims
Malaysian medical doctors
People's Justice Party (Malaysia) politicians
Members of the Dewan Rakyat
21st-century Malaysian politicians